Nicholas John Blinko (born 4 September 1961) is a British musician and artist, best known as the lead singer, lyricist, and guitar player for the anarcho-punk band Rudimentary Peni. He is also known for being an "outsider" artist, whose pen-and-ink drawings and paintings have been shown in galleries worldwide. Blinko also creates all the drawings used by the band for its artwork.

Career

Music
Nicholas John George Blinko's first recorded musical project was the Magits, who formed in 1977 and were primarily electronic. This band's only record, the 1979 7-inch EP Fully Coherent, was the first release on Blinko's Outer Himalayan Records label, and received occasional airplay by John Peel on Radio 1.

His most well-known and longest running band, Rudimentary Peni, formed in 1980 and would go on to release three albums and six EPs spanning 1981–2009. A full-length collection of the first two EPs was also released in 1987.

Rudimentary Peni's concept album Pope Adrian 37th Psychristiatric was allegedly written while Blinko was being detained in a psychiatric hospital under Section 3 of the UK Mental Health Act 1983. The subject matter of the album was purported to be based on the delusions Blinko was experiencing at this time.

Writing
Blinko has written and illustrated three books. The first, The Primal Screamer, was a fictionalized semi-autobiographical novel with horror elements. It was published in 1995 by Spare Change Books and received a second printing in 1997 and a third in 2002. The book is written as a series of journal entries made by the therapist of "Nathaniel Snoxell" (who starts a band which is never named but is similar to Rudimentary Peni in many ways). This book was reprinted in 2011 by PM Press, and collected artwork used for several previous editions under one cover for the first time. The 2011 edition was distributed by the Alternative Tentacles label.

Blinko's second book, Haunted Head, was published in 2009 by David Tibet via Coptic Cat, in a limited edition of approximately 350 copies. An exclusive micro-edition of 60 copies was also published, featuring an original piece of art, while all copies of the book contained a postcard with a handwritten excerpt from the book. The edition size reflected the number of Blinko's handwritten postcards, from which the text of the book was transcribed, and which were included in the book. The book also included a one-track CD of a song by Rudimentary Peni called "Wilfred Owen The Chances"

His third book was titled Visions of Pope Adrian 37th. It was published in 2011, again by Coptic Cat, in two extremely limited editions which both included a small piece of original art by Blinko, drawn directly onto a page of the book. The "standard edition" was limited to 370 copies, while the "special edition" was limited to 37.  The book included 87 drawings, an introduction by outsider art specialist Colin Rhodes and a brief introduction by Blinko. The artwork in this book was reproduced in its original A5 size.

Blinko also contributed to a collection of punk fiction short stories, Gobbing, Pogoing and Gratuitous Bad Language!: An Anthology of Punk Short Stories by Stewart Home (1996-04-06), published in 1996 by Spare Change Books. His story, "Punk Alice" (a reference to Rudimentary Peni's song "Alice Crucifies the Paedophiles"), is written in a sketchbook style of doodles and scribbled phrases referencing the death of punk, chess, Catholicism, depression, goth, Rudimentary Peni lyrics and drug chemicals.

Art
Blinko has contributed album artwork to several musical projects aside from his own. Among these are Part 1's 1985 release Pictures of Pain, released on Pushead's label Pusmort; Coil's 1997 release, Unnatural History III, released on Threshold House; Iron Lung's 2007 Prank Records release Sexless//No Sex; Omaniescum Aorisum's 2013 Solitude Records release Mademoiselle Hélène; and Fire in the Head's 2010 release Confessions of a Narcissist. He also contributed musically to two releases by Fire in the Head.

Blinko's artwork has been shown internationally and featured in books and magazines related to the field of outsider art. An exhibition at the National Schizophrenia Fellowship in 1994 first brought his art to public attention; he is now represented in the Collection de l'art brut in Lausanne. He had a show at Kinz + Tillou Gallery in New York City in 2006. Some of Blinko's artwork was featured at the Portland, Oregon art exhibit "Entartete Kunts" in June 2009. In 2011, he had a solo exhibit titled "Visions of Pope Adrian 37th" at Pallant House Gallery in the U.K.

Colin Rhodes' Outsider Art: Spontaneous Alternatives, published by Thames & Hudson in 2000, featured Blinko's art and a description of his working process.

Personal life
Blinko currently resides in Abbots Langley, Hertfordshire. He has been diagnosed with schizoaffective disorder. Blinko's younger brother is Timothy Blinko, composer and Professor of Music at the University of Hertfordshire.

References

External links
Nick Blinko's Artwork from the Henry Boxer Gallery
Brainwashed
Rudimentary Peni

1961 births
20th-century English male writers
21st-century English male writers
20th-century English novelists
21st-century English novelists
Anarcho-punk musicians
English anarchists
English male guitarists
English male novelists
English male singers
English punk rock guitarists
English punk rock singers
Living people
Musicians from Hertfordshire
Gothic rock musicians
Outsider artists
People from Abbots Langley
People with schizoaffective disorder